Guru Mother is a 1994 album by Opus III. It features the dance club hit "When You Made the Mountain". The album contains positive lyrics including one track that is a Sanskrit prayer ("Guru Mother"). It integrates strands of Eastern spirituality (the belief that all nature is divine) with ecology. The CD booklet also included the poem "Let There Be Many Windows in Your Soul" by Ralph Waldo Trine. Singer Kirsty Hawkshaw commented on the booklet: "respect to all those who take big risks to preserve our beautiful countryside. to those who don't care about nature: without it we are nothing. all the sahaja yogis of the world and last but  least the holy spirit for guiding, inspiring and connecting us all the way."

The cover was created by Colin Heinsen.

Track listing
 "Dreaming of Now" – 5:52
 "When You Made the Mountain" – 5:32
 "Guru Mother" – 5:59
 "Hand in Hand (Looking for Sweet Inspiration)" – 5:01
 "Outside" – 6:02
 "Release the Joy" – 5:51
 "Elemental" – 6:01
 "Cozyland?" – 4:10
 "Sushumna" – 4:58
 "When She Rises" – 5:21

Additional information
Martin Brammer and Andrea Bell supplied backing vocals.

References

External links
Album at unofficial Kirsty Hawkshaw discography

1994 albums
Opus III (band) albums
East West Records albums
Pete Waterman Entertainment albums